Greenport is a village in Suffolk County, on the North Fork of Long Island, in New York, United States. The population was 2,197 at the 2010 census.

The Incorporated Village of Greenport is located entirely within the Town of Southold and is the only incorporated community in the town.

Greenport was a major port for its area, having developed a strong fishing and whaling industry in the past, although currently there are only a handful of commercial fishing vessels operating out of the village. More recently the tourism industry has grown substantially too, especially in the summer.

History
Greenport was first settled in 1682.  The village was called Winter Harbor, Stirling, and Green Hill and was incorporated in 1838. Greenport was once a whaling and ship building village, and since 1844, has been the eastern terminal station on the north fork for the Long Island Rail Road.

During Prohibition, rum running and speakeasies became a significant part of Greenport's economy.  Greenport's residents knew the waters well and could outrun the coastguard. Restaurants on the east end, including Claudio's in Greenport, served the illegal booze. Many of the village's older structures are included in the Greenport Village Historic District, which was added to the National Register of Historic Places in 1986.

Police department disbanded

Village residents voted 617–339 in November 1994 to disband their nine-member police department. The department, which was established in 1947, was shut down after a grand jury investigation into a series of scandals.  Since the shutdown, police services have been provided by the Southold Town Police Department. In 2005, trustees established a local chapter parapolice organization of volunteer vigilantes, Guardian Angels, to patrol the village.

Code Enforcement & Fire Prevention

In June 2016, the Village of Greenport began enforcing its own vehicle and traffic code, marking the first time since 1994 the Village enforced its traffic laws. The Village of Greenport Code Enforcement & Fire Prevention Department continue to enforce the Village Code, as well as a number of other Federal, State and Local rules & regulations.

Geography

Climate

Demographics

As of the census of 2000, there were 2,048 people, 776 households, and 446 families residing in the village. The population density was 2,142.7 people per square mile (823.7/km2). There were 1,075 housing units at an average density of 1,124.7 per square mile (432.4/km2). The racial makeup of the village was 76.17% White, 14.26% African American, 0.39% Asian, 0.54% Pacific Islander, 4.74% from other races, and 3.91% from two or more races. Hispanic or Latino of any race were 17.24% of the population.

There were 776 households, out of which 28.7% had children under the age of 18 living with them, 35.1% were married couples living together, 16.0% had a female householder with no husband present, and 42.5% were non-families. 34.9% of all households were made up of individuals, and 16.6% had someone living alone who was 65 years of age or older. The average household size was 2.42 and the average family size was 3.10.

In the village, the population was spread out, with 23.2% under the age of 18, 8.7% from 18 to 24, 23.7% from 25 to 44, 21.8% from 45 to 64, and 22.5% who were 65 years of age or older. The median age was 40 years. For every 100 females, there were 87.2 males. For every 100 females age 18 and over, there were 81.3 males.

The median income for a household in the village was $31,675, and the median income for a family was $36,333. Males had a median income of $36,848 versus $22,165 for females. The per capita income for the village was $17,595. About 21.2% of families and 19.7% of the population were below the poverty line, including 33.7% of those under age 18 and 11.7% of those age 65 or over.

In 2010, the breakdown was as follows:
 53.6% White
 34.0% Hispanic
 10.0% Black
 0.5% Asian
 0.1% Native American
 0.5% some Other Race
 1.5% Two or More Races

Tourism

Greenport is also known for its tourism during the summer. It has a locally famous 1920s carousel, located near the waterfront. The village is also the home of the East End Seaport Museum & Marine Foundation, which hosts the annual Maritime Festival each September. The museum is housed in the former station house of the Greenport Long Island Rail Road station, while the East end of the Railroad Museum of Long Island is located in the former freight house. The new station is the terminus of the Long Island Rail Road.

Most of the tourism stems from maritime activities, as well as proximity to the more than 40 vineyards on the East End of Long Island. It has many small shops and boutiques, ice cream parlors, bed-and-breakfasts, and restaurants ranging from fine-dining to paper-napkin crab shacks.

Greenport is also home to upscale hotels like The Menhaden, American Beech and The Sound View as well as historic motels like the Silver Sands.

Greenport proves to be the hub of the North Fork foodie culture with many acclaimed restaurants.  Noah's, First and South, PORT, Lucharito's, The Frisky Oyster, Anker, Kontiki, and 1943 Pizza Bar all rank among new and acclaimed restaurants on the North Fork in the village. It is home to Claudio's Restaurants, the oldest single-family owned restaurant until it was sold in 2018. Since then, it has become a staple of the waterfront town, boasting four venues on the property. It is most well known for its main restaurant on the corner of Main Street. The building itself is over 150 years old and is known for its upscale dining experience. The property has also gained traction for their waterfront bar and restaurant, as well as Crabby Jerry's. Within the last five years, it has gained a following during the summer months for its late night experience and dockside dining for boaters.

Government 
The Mayor of the Village of Greenport is George Hubbard, Jr., who was elected in March, 2015.  He succeeded Mayor David Nyce, under whom Hubbard served as a Trustee and Deputy Mayor.  The Village is governed by a five-member board of Trustees, of which the Mayor is the chair and a voting member.  The Mayor and Trustees serve four-year terms.  Village Trustee Jack Martilotta, elected in March, 2015, serves as Deputy Mayor.  The other Trustees are Peter Clarke (elected March, 2019), Mary Bess Phillips (first elected March, 2009, re-elected in 2013 and 2017), and Julia Robins (first elected March, 2013, re-elected 2017).

Schools

The Greenport Union Free School District provides public education for the area. Students from Greenport and Greenport West are zoned in the district as well as students in grade 7-12 from Orient and East Marion who go to Oysterponds Elementary School. The main building at 720 Front Street serves as a Junior-Senior High School and the back annex serves as an Elementary School and Kindergarten.

The Old Kindergarten Schoolhouse was Greenport's first schoolhouse. It was located on the North Road and attended by children from Arshamomaque, Stirling (now Greenport) and East Marion.  In 1832, a larger schoolhouse was built on Front Street and Greenport students transferred to the new location. In 1879, the first kindergarten was established and the old schoolhouse was moved from the North Road to 4th Avenue and South Street (now the location of the Greenport Fire Department). Greenport students attended kindergarten in the building until 1932.

In 2005, the Old Kindergarten Schoolhouse was moved to its present site on Front Street and with oversight by the Greenport Improvement Committee, was restored with matching funds from the Village of Greenport and New York State. The building is now the Village's historic interpretive center and a venue for community meetings and events.

Houses of worship

 Saints Anargyroi, Taxiarchis and Gerasimos Greek Orthodox Church, 702 Main Street, Greenport, NY 11944
 Clinton Memorial A.M.E. Zion Church,  614 3rd Street, Greenport, NY 11944
 First Baptist Church of Greenport, 654 Main Street, Greenport, NY 11944
 Holy Trinity Episcopal Church, 768 Main Street, Greenport, NY 11944
 St. Agnes Church, 523 Front Street, Greenport, NY 11944
 St. Peter's Lutheran Church, 71305 Main Road, Greenport, NY 11944
 Congregation Tifereth Israel, 500 4th Street, Greenport, NY 11944

Transportation
Greenport is the easternmost terminus for the Long Island Rail Road's Ronkonkoma Branch, which provides limited service between Greenport terminal and Ronkonkoma station, making stops in other North Fork towns. At Ronkonkoma, passengers can connect to New York City bound trains. It is also served by Suffolk County Transit's S92 bus route, which runs from Orient Point Ferry Terminal to East Hampton via Riverhead. Hampton Jitney's North Fork Line also brings passengers to New York City.

In Greenport, train and bus passengers can connect to the North Ferry to Shelter Island where they can connect to a ferry to North Haven.

Gallery

Sister City 

 Parrsboro, Nova Scotia, Canada.

References

16.
https://web.archive.org/web/20140419013436/http://www.greenportvillage.com/listingDetail.cfm?currentListing=283

External links

Official website
Greenport Village Official Information
East End Seaport Museum & Marine Foundation
Railroad Museum of Long Island (Greenport)
Greenport Farmers Market

Populated coastal places in New York (state)
Villages in Suffolk County, New York
Southold, New York
Villages in New York (state)
Populated places established in 1682
1682 establishments in the Province of New York